Rust and oxidation lubricant (R&O) is a mild lubricant treated with corrosion inhibitors.

Uses for Lubricant
The oil is used mainly for bearing, and lightly loaded gearbox applications.

Special Purpose Turbine Lubricant
Turbine oil is classified as R&O, but the quality is much higher.

Lubricants